Kaytron Lamont Allen (born January 8, 2003) is an American football running back for the Penn State Nittany Lions.

Early life and high school career
Allen grew up in Norfolk, Virginia. He initially attended Norview High School and rushed for 1,465 yards and 16 touchdowns as a freshman before transferring to IMG Academy in Bradenton, Florida. Allen rushed for 1,097 yards and 16 touchdowns on 135 carries in his first season at IMG. He rushed for 515 yards and nine touchdowns in seven games during his junior season. Allen rushed for over 1,400 yards and scored 27 touchdowns as a senior. Allen was rated a four-star recruit and committed to play college football at Penn State over offers from Alabama, Maryland, Tennessee, USC, Georgia, Ohio State, Florida, Texas, and Miami.

College career
Allen joined the Penn State Nittany Lions as an early enrollee in January 2022. He entered his freshman season as the Nittany Lions' third running back. Allen was named the Big Ten Freshman of the Week after rushing for 111 yards and one touchdown on 13 carries in a 33–14 win over Central Michigan.

References

External links
Penn State Nittany Lions bio

Living people
American football running backs
Penn State Nittany Lions football players
Players of American football from Virginia
2003 births